La Tamponnaise is a football club from Le Tampon, Réunion Island, founded in 1982 as the result of the merger between S/S Tamponnaise (founded in 1922) and Stade Tamponnais (founded in 1971). Since 2014 the club was renamed as La Tamponnaise.

Stadium

The club plays its home matches at Stade Klébert Picard, which has a maximum capacity of 4,000 people.

Achievements

Réunion Premier League: 11
1991, 1992, 1999, 2003, 2004, 2005, 2006, 2007, 2009, 2010, 2021.

Coupe de la Réunion: 6
1991, 2000, 2003, 2008, 2009, 2012

Coupe D.O.M: 1
2000

Outremer Champions Cup: 3
2001, 2004, 2007

Océan Indien Cup: 3
2004, 2006, 2007

Performance in CAF competitions
CAF Champions League: 4 appearances
2000 – First Round
2004 – withdrew in First Round
2008 – First Round
2009 – First Round

CAF Cup: 4 appearances
1995 – First Round
1996 – Quarter-Finals
1997 – First Round
1999 – Second Round

CAF Cup Winners' Cup: 2 appearances
1994 – Quarter-Finals
2001 – First Round

The club in the French football structure
French Cup: 6 appearances
1992–93, 1998–99, 2003–04, 2006–07, 2011–12, 2022-23
{| class="wikitable" style="text-align: center"
|+ Ties won
! Year !! Round !! Home team (tier) !! Score !! Away team (tier)
|-
| 2006–07 || Round 7 || Schiltigheim (4) || 0–7 || US Stade Tamponnaise
|-
| 2022–23 || Round 8 || La Tamponnaise || 1–0 || FCM Aubervilliers (5)
|}

Squad

External links
Official Site

La Tamponnaise
Association football clubs established in 1982
1982 establishments in Réunion